Erlend Hanstveit (born 28 January 1981 in Bergen) is a former Norwegian footballer. He has won the Norwegian Premier League, the Norwegian Cup, the Belgian Cup and Allsvenskan, in addition to caps for the Norway national football team.

Career
Hailing from Osterøy, he joined Norwegian Premier League team Brann in June 1998 despite interest from big clubs like PSV Eindhoven, Leeds United and Manchester United, with whom he had a trial in December 1997. Originally a midfielder, he gradually became a first team regular at Brann as well as the Norway national under-21 football team, playing 27 international U-21 matches in total. During 2001–02, Erlend Hanstveit converted to defence, settling in the left back position, where he has played since. On 28 January 2004, his 23rd birthday, Hanstveit made his debut for the senior national team.

Hanstveit became one of the mainstays in Brann, with over 200 Norwegian Premier League matches and over 270 matches in total. During his 10-year career in Brann, Hanstveit won one Premiership gold, two silver, and two bronze, in addition to the 2004 Norwegian Cup and Norwegian Cup silver in 1999. He was also the club's vice-captain from 2004 to 2008.

In early December 2008, he joined Celtic on a week-long trial but failed to win a contract with the Scottish Premier League club. However, he did not accept Brann's contract offer either, due to his wish to play abroad. During the winter break of 2008–09 he joined the Belgian team KAA Gent, coached by Michel Preud'homme.

On 24 August 2011 it was announced that Hanstveit would be joining Swedish club Helsingborgs IF on a free transfer.
Gent had wanted to extend his contract but the Norwegian wanted to move.

On 20 December 2013, Hanstveit signed a two years contract with SK Brann.

Career statistics

Honours

Club
Brann
Norwegian Premier League: 2007
Norwegian Cup: 2004

Gent
Belgian Cup: 2009–10

Helsingborgs IF
Swedish Premier League: 2011

References 

1981 births
Living people
People from Osterøy
Norwegian footballers
Norway international footballers
Norway under-21 international footballers
SK Brann players
K.A.A. Gent players
Helsingborgs IF players
Eliteserien players
Norwegian First Division players
Belgian Pro League players
Allsvenskan players
Norwegian expatriate footballers
Norwegian expatriate sportspeople in Belgium
Expatriate footballers in Belgium
Norwegian expatriate sportspeople in Sweden
Expatriate footballers in Sweden
Association football fullbacks
Sportspeople from Vestland